The Final Comedown is a 1972 blaxploitation drama film written, produced and directed by Oscar Williams and starring Billy Dee Williams and D'Urville Martin. The film is an examination of racism in the United States and depicts a shootout between a radical black nationalist group and the police, with the backstory leading up to the shootout told through flashbacks.  The radical group is not identified by name in the film but closely resembles the Black Panther Party.

The film was recut and re-released in 1976 under the title Blast! The new version, which credited "Frank Arthur Wilson" as the director, featured additional footage directed by Allan Arkush.

The original version has had several releases on DVD from various budget-line DVD manufacturers.

Plot

Cast
 Billy Dee Williams
 D'Urville Martin
 Celia Kaye
 Billy Durkin
 Raymond St. Jacques

Production
Roger Corman put up $15,000 of the film's budget.

Soundtrack

References

External links 

 
 

1972 films
Blaxploitation films
1970s action films
Films about racism
New World Pictures films
1970s English-language films
American exploitation films
American action films
1970s American films